Je Tu Niekto? is the third album by the Slovak punk rock band Iné Kafe, released on 4 September 2000.

Track listing

Personnel
 Vratko Rohoň - vocals, guitar
 Tibor Prikler - guitar
 Peter "Forus" Fóra - bass
 Dano Mathia – drums

Guest artists
 Roman "Fernet" Slávik - backing vocals (3, 4, 6)
 DJ Zeno - scratching

References

2000 albums
Iné Kafe albums